Nemastomoides is an extinct genus of harvestmen known from the Carboniferous fossil record.  The genus is the only member of the family Nemastomoididae and contains three described species. Nemastomoides elaveris was found in the Coal Measures of Commentry in northern France, together with Eotrogulus fayoli.

Alexander Petrunkevitch described two fossil harvestmen from Mazon Creek, Illinois, United States, in 1913 in the genus Protopilio, but later synonymized the two with the genus Nemastomoides.

While N. longipes is a harvestman with long legs and a segmented oval body, N. depressus is in reality not a harvestman, but a poorly preserved phalangiotarbid.

While the Nemastomoididae are currently included in the harvestman suborder Dyspnoi, they look more like Eupnoi.

Species
 Nemastomoides elaveris Thevenin, 1901
 Nemastomoides longipes (Petrunkevitch, 1913)

Not a harvestman, but a phalangiotarbid:
 Nemastomoides depressus (Petrunkevitch, 1913)

Footnotes

References
 Joel Hallan's Biology Catalog: Nemastomoididae
 Thevenin, A. (1901): Sur la découverte d'arachnides dans le terrain houiller de Commentry. Bull Soc Géol. Fr. 4(1): 605-611.
 Petrunkevitch, A. I. (1955): Arachnida. pp. 42–162 in Treatise on Invertebrate Palaeontology, part P. Arthropoda 2 (R. C. Moore, ed.). Geological Society of America & University of Kansas Press, Lawrence.
 Pinto-da-Rocha, R., Machado, G. & Giribet, G. (eds.) (2007): Harvestmen - The Biology of Opiliones. Harvard University Press 

Carboniferous arthropods
Harvestmen
Carboniferous arachnids
Fossils of the United States